Šušnjevica  (Istro-Romanian: Šušnjevice) is a small village in Istria County, Croatia, in the municipality of Kršan. In 2011, the population of the village was 69. The village is inhabited mostly by Istro-Romanians.

Location 
It is located in the North-Eastern part of Istria, 20 km North from Labin and 10 km from the centre of the municipality Kršan. It is on the local road Šušnjevica-Vozilići (L50180), near the road D500, which connects roads D64 and A8. It is near Northern part of Čepić field.

History 
Archeological evidence suggests that it was a populated place in prehistoric as well as Roman times. During the Middle Ages, it belonged to the lord of Kožljak. The earliest surviving written evidence of the place dates from 1340. During the 15th and 16th centuries, numerous Istro-Romanians presumably settled in the area. There are contradictory claims, however, that they came much earlier - specifically, during Roman times. In 1922, under the period of Italian rule, because of its Romanian language and the distinct origin of its population, it was made the center of a municipality.

Its church of St. John the Baptist was built in 1838, replacing the older single-nave church. In the churchyard is a chapel dedicated to St. Sylvester, dating from the 16th and 17th centuries, in which the remains of frescoes and Glagolithic graphites can be seen.

The inhabitants mainly lived from agriculture, and until the draining of Lake Čepić also from fishing.

Population

References 

Sources

External links
Istria on the Internet - Šušnjevica

Populated places in Istria County
Istro-Romanian settlements